is a Shintō shrine which exists in Tokyo Minato Ward Takanawa 2-chome 14-18.  It was established in the Meio years (1492–1501).  January 24 of 2 of Koka a fire broke out, except to the stone gate and Otorii, all buildings burned. The present main hall of the shrine was built in 1980.  The annual festival is September 10, and other ceremony the festival of being extinguished is hosted.

Shinto shrines in Tokyo
Inari shrines